Mehdi Zaheer (1927 – 5 April 1988) was a Paksitani musician, singer, poet, and radio producer. He is best known for singing Hum Mustfvi Hein, composing music for Faiz Ahmed Faiz's ghazal Dasht-e-Tanhai (sung by Iqbal Bano), and writing Ahmed Rushdi's song Bandar Road Se Kemari.

Life and career
Zaheer was born as Syed Iftikhar Mehdi in 1927 in Lucknow, Uttar Pradesh, British India. He was fluent in Urdu, Arabic, and Persian languages. He started his radio career at Radio Pakistan, Karachi. In the mid-1950s, he wrote and composed a song "Bandar Road Se Kemari Meri Chali Re Ghora Gari" which was sung by Ahmed Rushdi for a children's radio show. The song became popular and later helped Rushdi establish his career as a playback singer. Another milestone of Zaheer's career was the composition of Faiz Ahmed Faiz's ghazal Dasht-e-Tanhai Mein Ae Jaan-e-Jehan. It was rendered by Iqbal Bano and immediately became famous all across the country. Later, he also vocalized Nazeer Akbarabadi's Urdu poems "Aadmi Nama" and "Banjara Nama".

In 1974, Zaheer gave voice to an Islamic nationalistic anthem Ham Mustafvi, Mustafvi Hein, which was composed by Sohail Rana for the occasion of the second Islamic Summit Conference held in Lahore. He is also known for rendering a nashid Qaseeda Burda Sharif.

Death
Zaheer died on 5 April 1988 in Karachi.

Compositions and songs

References

1927 births
1988 deaths
Pakistani composers
People from Lucknow
Pakistani male singers
Pakistani poets